A centrifugal gun is a type of rapid-fire projectile accelerator, like a machine gun but operating on a different principle. Centrifugal guns use a rapidly rotating disc to impart energy to the projectiles, replacing gunpowder with kinetic energy.

A steam-powered centrifugal gun built by Charles Dickinson of Boston was tested during the American Civil War. This gun was popularly but incorrectly attributed to pro-Southern Maryland millionaire and inventor Ross Winans. Another hand-cranked centrifugal gun that fired musket balls was designed by Robert McCarty during the same period. Despite repeated tests, including one in the presence of Abraham Lincoln, McCarty's gun never saw service. Dahlgren however took the idea seriously, and after testing McCarty's prototype, he built a steam-powered 12 pounder which could fire 15 rounds in 16 seconds and had a range of a mile. It was extremely inaccurate however. As historian Robert V. Bruce notes: "the sole casualty of centrifugal gunfire during the Civil War seems to have been one ill-starred Army mule".

The idea was even tested during World War I by the US Bureau of Standards, using a prototype built by lawyer Edward T. Moore, and advertised as a silent machine gun. The prototype used a powerful electric motor to spin the gun's grooved rotor. It was abandoned due to extremely poor accuracy. Moore was granted USPTO patent number 1332992. Another design can be found in USPTO patent number 1311492, granted in July 1919. Another effort during World War I was to build a centrifugal gun powered by an aircraft's engine. This design was advanced by E. L. Rice and taken seriously by Robert Andrews Millikan and the National Research Council; the project ultimately proved "beyond resolution".

In 2005, a new centrifugal weapon called DREAD, invented by Charles St George, was discussed in New Scientist and in Annals of Improbable Research. DREAD, patented in 2003, claims to launch projectiles with the speed of a handgun, at about 300 m/s.

In an episode from the 2007 season of MythBusters Adam and Jamie built a replica of the Winans Steam Gun and found it unreliable.

SpinLaunch, a California company founded in 2014, is working to launch satellites into space with a system similar to a centrifugal gun.

See also
 Chain gun
 Fokker-Leimberger
 Gatling gun
 Gorgas machine gun
 Pitching machine
 Revolver cannon

References

Projectile weapons